Antonio Rosado (born 9 March 1931) is a Mexican wrestler. He competed in the men's freestyle welterweight at the 1952 Summer Olympics.

References

1931 births
Living people
Mexican male sport wrestlers
Olympic wrestlers of Mexico
Wrestlers at the 1952 Summer Olympics
Sportspeople from Mexico City
Pan American Games medalists in wrestling
Pan American Games bronze medalists for Mexico
Wrestlers at the 1955 Pan American Games
Wrestlers at the 1959 Pan American Games
20th-century Mexican people
21st-century Mexican people